János Halász (15 May 1929 – 30 October 2017) was a Hungarian basketball player. He competed at the 1948 Summer Olympics.

References

External links
 
 

1929 births
2017 deaths
Hungarian men's basketball players
Olympic basketball players of Hungary
Basketball players at the 1948 Summer Olympics
Sportspeople from Szeged